Al-Murabaa is one of the annual zones of the Riyadh Season entertainment festival held at the National Museum Park of King Abdulaziz Historical Center in the al-Murabba neighborhood of Riyadh, Saudi Arabia. Inaugurated in October 2019 during the first edition of Riyadh Season, it features several seasonal restaurants and cafes with international cuisines that offer culinary traditions from countries like America, Italy, Greece, Japan, Argentina and France.

References 

Tourist attractions in Riyadh
2019 establishments in Saudi Arabia
Food and drink in Saudi Arabia
Food retailers